Astyra was a town of ancient Troad, mentioned by Strabo. Strabo writes that it was above Abydus and once an independent city, but in Strabo's time it was a ruined place, and belonged to the inhabitants of Abydus. There were once gold mines there, but they were nearly exhausted in Strabo's time.

References

Populated places in ancient Troad
Former populated places in Turkey
Ancient Greek archaeological sites in Turkey
History of Çanakkale Province